Ludeman Glacier is a valley glacier,  long, flowing north through the Commonwealth Range, Antarctica, to enter the east side of Beardmore Glacier at a point  north of Mount Donaldson. It was named by the Advisory Committee on Antarctic Names for Lieutenant Commander Emmert E. Ludeman, U.S. Navy, officer in charge at the Naval Air Facility, McMurdo Sound, 1958.

References

Glaciers of Dufek Coast